Maia , designated 20 Tauri  (abbreviated 20 Tau), is a star in the constellation of Taurus.  It is a blue giant of spectral type B8 III, a chemically peculiar star, and the prototype of the Maia variable class of variable star.

Maia is the fourth-brightest star in the Pleiades open star cluster (Messier 45), after Alcyone, Atlas and Electra.  It is surrounded by one of the brighter reflection nebulae within the Pleiades, designated NGC 1432 and sometimes called the Maia Nebula.

Nomenclature 
Maia is one of the seven daughters of Atlas and Pleione in Greek mythology—stars which are also included in the Pleiades star cluster. In 2016, the International Astronomical Union organized a Working Group on Star Names (WGSN) to catalog and standardize proper names for stars. The WGSN's first bulletin of July 2016 included a table of the first two batches of names approved by the WGSN; which included Maia for this star. It is now so entered in the IAU Catalog of Star Names.

20 Tauri is the star's Flamsteed designation. Although it is about the 15th brightest star in Taurus, Maia does not have a Bayer designation, but does have the Bright Star Catalogue designation HR 1149 and the Henry Draper Catalogue designation HD 23408. The primary is listed as being double following observations of a lunar occultation, but later observations have failed to find any evidence of it being double.

Description 

The distance to Maia has been measured by the Gaia spacecraft using the annual parallax method.

Maia's visual magnitude is 3.87, requiring darker skies to be seen. Its bolometric luminosity is 501 times solar, mostly in the ultraviolet, thus suggesting a radius that is 3.6 times that of the Sun and a mass that is 3.8 times solar.

Maia is a chemically peculiar star, meaning it has an unusual surface abundance of some elements as shown by its spectral lines.  It is classified as a helium-weak star, but it also shows an excess of some elements including manganese.

Maia was thought to be a variable star by astronomer Otto Struve. He proposed a class of stars known as Maia variables, which included Gamma Ursae Minoris. Examination of the Hipparcos data for Maia and some others in the class found no evidence of variability. On the other hand, White et al. found low amplitude, but unambiguous, variability in Maia's brightness as seen by Kepler/K2, with a period of 10.3 days, which they attribute to the rotation of a starspot. These are potentially Maia variables. Ironically, if the White et al. results are correct, Maia is a variable star, but not a Maia variable star.

Maia is surrounded by the Maia Nebula (also known as NGC 1432), a reflection nebula that is one of the brightest patches of nebulosity within the Pleiades star cluster. It is the only member of the New General Catalogue discovered photographically.

Mythology

Maia was the oldest of seven beautiful sisters known as the Pleiades.  She was impregnated by Zeus, thereby conceiving Hermes, the messenger god. As Maia and the Pleiades are visible in the winter night sky along with the constellation Orion, the Greek myths tell of Maia and her sisters being pursued by the giant huntsman and turned into doves to preserve their safety.

References

External links 

Jim Kaler's Stars, University of Illinois:Maia (20 Tauri)
High-resolution LRGB image based on 4 hrs total exposure: NGC 1432 - Maia Nebula 
APOD Pictures:
1) Orion, the giant huntsman, in pursuit of the Pleiades
2) Young Moon and Sister Stars 
3) Pleiades and Stardust

B-type giants
Tauri, 020
Pleiades Open Cluster
Taurus (constellation)
Maia
Suspected variables
1149
023408
017573
Durchmusterung objects
NGC objects